This is a list of notable people who are the subject of a Wikipedia article and were born in or are associated with Islamabad, Pakistan.

Politics 

 Jamshed Ayaz Khan – major general (Pakistan Army)
 Tridev Roy – politician and writer
 Wasim Sajjad – former Chairman of the Senate of Pakistan
 Anjum Aqeel Khan – politician
 Nayyar Hussain Bukhari – former Chairman of the Senate of Pakistan
 Asad Umar – Former Finance Minister

Sports 

 Zeeshan Abbasi – blind cricketer
 Shoaib Akhtar – cricketer
 Usman Khawaja – Australian cricketer
 Muhammad Musa – cricketer
 Muhammad Qasim - footballer
 Ijaz-ur-Rehman – ten-pin bowler
 Adnan Saleem – cricketer
 Imad Wasim – cricketer

Media and entertainment 

 Imran Abbas – singer and actor
 Hamza Ali Abbasi – actor, director and producer
 Kashif Abbasi – journalist and news anchor
 Tariq Amin – hairdresser and stylist
 Osman Khalid Butt – actor and writer
 Faakhir – musician
 Hareem Farooq – producer and actor
 Agha Iqrar Haroon – journalist
 Mawra Hocane – actress and lawyer
 Urwa Hocane – VJ, actress and producer
 Talat Hussain – journalist
 Yasir Hussain – actor and host
 Madiha Iftikhar – TV actress and model
 Shamoon Ismail – singer, songwriter and composer
 Umair Jaswal – singer and actor
 Uzair Jaswal – singer and actor
 Yasir Jaswal – director
 Khushhal Khan – singer and actor
 Ali Rehman Khan – actor
 Ashiq Khan – film actor and filmmaker
 Nadia Khan – morning show host, actor, vlogger and producer
 Shamil Khan – film and TV actor
 Zarnish Khan – actor
 Usman Mukhtar – director, actor and cinematographer
 Momina Mustehsan – singer
 Mariyam Nafees – actor

 Adil Omar – musician and rapper
 Rumer – musician and songwriter
 Saleem Safi – journalist and columnist
 Ali Saleem – TV actor and host
 Farrukh Saleem – journalist and columnist
 Asma Shirazi – journalist
 Marvi Sirmed – journalist and columnist

Sciences and literature 

 Zaheer Ahmad – physician and philanthropist
 Zafar Ishaq Ansari – Muslim scholar
 Muhammad Asim Butt – Urdu novelist
 Ahmad Hasan Dani – archaeologist and historian
 Abdul Rashid – nuclear and bio-scientist
 Rahman Syed – entomologist and professor
 Mansha Yaad – writer

Other 
 Sadruddin Hashwani – businessman
 Julius Salik – activist

See also 
 List of people from Rawalpindi

References

 
People
Islamabad